After Dark is a 1994 studio album by the American jazz tenor saxophonist Don Braden. Released on the Criss Cross Jazz label, the album presents a recording taken in New York City on January 5, 1993. Critically well received, After Dark is listed as one of the "Core Collection" albums in The Penguin Guide to Jazz.

Theme
Recorded in New York City on January 5, 1993, the album is centered on the theme of night time, with a mix of original compositions and jazz standards as well as one pop song by Stevie Wonder. The music critic Howard Reich suggested that Braden's goal was not to set out specific vignettes, but to "evoke different states of mind that the night inspires."

Critical reception

The album has been critically well received. The Penguin Guide to Jazz numbers it among the "core collection" which jazz fans should possess. AllMusic describes it as one of the best releases of the year and adds that the album is "a positive step in Braden's rapid development." In its review of the album, JazzTimes wrote that Braden was a "magnetic player" and a "convincing composer", describing the album overall as "a very satisfying follow-up to Braden's previous Criss Cross dates". Reich, in the Chicago Tribune, wrote that the album was "a strong performance from an up-and-coming talent", "a musically appealing and intellectually intriguing recording."

Track listing
"After Dark" (Don Braden) – 6:44
"Night" (Braden) – 6:46
"You and the Night and the Music" (Howard Dietz, Arthur Schwartz) – 6:38
"Creepin'" (Stevie Wonder) – 7:16
"R.E.M." (Braden) – 5:54
"Stars Fell on Alabama" (Frank Perkins) – 8:03
"Monk's Dream" (Thelonious Monk) – 7:56
"Dawn" (Braden) – 6:04
"The Hang" (Braden) – 9:35

Personnel
Carl Allen – drums, piano
Bob Bernotas – liner notes
Noah Bless – trombone
Don Braden – arranger, flute, tenor saxophone
Darrell Grant – piano
Christian McBride – double bass
Gerry Teekens – producer
Scott Wendholt – flugelhorn, trumpet
Steve Wilson – alto saxophone

References

Don Braden albums
1994 albums
Criss Cross Jazz albums